Kınalıada (Turkish for: Henna Island; ,  'first'; , Gnali kghzi) is the fourth smallest inhabited island in the Princes' Islands in the Sea of Marmara; near Istanbul, Turkey. Administratively, it is a neighbourhood in the Adalar district of Istanbul. In the past it was called Proti by its Greek residents.

Kınalıada means "Henna Island" in Turkish, because the land has a reddish colour as a result of the iron and copper that has been mined there. It is dominated by Çınar Tepesi (Plane Tree Hill, 115 m/377 ft), Teşrifiye Tepesi (Visiting Hill, 110 m/360 ft) and Manastır Tepesi (Monastery Hill, 93 m/305 ft). This is one of the least forested of the Prince Islands.

Proti (Greek: First) was the island most commonly used as a place of exile under the Byzantine Empire. The most notable exile was Emperor Romanos IV Diogenes, who remained in the Monastery of the Transfiguration on Hristo Peak of the island after the Battle of Manzikert in 1071.

During the summer, approximately 90% of the island's population used to be Armenian, and although this is no longer the case, quite a few Istanbul Armenians do still move to the island in summer. The island is also home to the only Armenian church in the islands, the Church of Krikor Lusavoriç which was largely rebuilt in 1988.

The island is home to one former Greek Orthodox monastery, the Monastery of Christ.

The waterfront Kınalıada Mosque is a rare example of modern architecture in the islands. It was designed in 1964 by Başar Acarlı and Turhan Ayuroğlu to evoke the shape of a yacht.

Şehir Hatları ferries connect the island with the mainland from terminals at Eminönü and Kabataş on the European side of Istanbul and from Kadıköy and Bostancı on the Asian side. As it is the closest of the Princes' Islands to the ferry terminals of mainland Istanbul, most of the ferries call first at Kınalıada before continuing to Burgazada, Heybeliada and Büyükada.

Notable residents
Empress Irene (c. 752–803) - Byzantine empress
Michael I Rangabe (c. 770–844) - Byzantine emperor 
Romanos I Lekapenos (870–948) - Byzantine emperor
Romanos IV Diogenes (c. 1030–1072) - Exiled Byzantine emperor
Zabel Sibil Asadour (1863–1934) - Armenian poet and writer
Eşfak Aykaç (1918–2003) - Turkish football player and coach
Zahrad (1924–2007) - Armenian poet
Mesrob II Mutafyan (1956–2019) - Armenian Patriarch

See also 
 List of Armenian ethnic enclaves

References 

 Kınalıada at Istanbul Metropolitan Municipality website

External links

 Images of Kınalıada
 Everything about Kinaliada

Islands of the Sea of Marmara
Islands of Turkey
Fishing communities in Turkey
Neighbourhoods of Adalar, Istanbul
Islands of Istanbul Province
Armenian communities in Turkey